The Rocky River is a stream in the Australian state of South Australia located on the west end of Kangaroo Island in the locality of Flinders Chase. 

See also

References

Rivers of Kangaroo Island